The 2018 World Rowing U23 Championships is the 14th edition of the World Rowing U23 Championships and was held from 25 July to 29 July 2018 in Poznań.

Men's events

Women's events

Medal table

See also 
 2018 World Rowing Championships
 2018 World Rowing Junior Championships

References

External links 
 Official website
 WorldRowing website

World Rowing U23 Championships
Rowing competitions in Poland
2018 in Polish sport
International sports competitions hosted by Poland
Sport in Poznań
2018 in rowing
July 2018 sports events in Poland